Resurrection is the 2002 compilation album from English progressive rock band Atomic Rooster. The album comes as a three-disc set, which features songs from Atomic Roooster (1970), Death Walks Behind You (1970) and In Hearing of Atomic Rooster (1971).

Track listing

References

2002 compilation albums
Atomic Rooster compilation albums